Hadj M'rizek (1912 – February 12, 1955) was an Algerian songwriter, lyricist, composer, poet and painter.

Biography
Arezki Chaïeb was born in the Casbah of Algiers in 1912. He is interested in music through his half-brother, a promoter. It follows the performances of the stars of the time as Mustapha Nador.

M'rizek follows a classical music education (tar, darbuka) then his instrument of choice became the mandole. He learns the great texts of folk poetry and works different types of songs starting with the hawzi first before getting to chaâbi. M'rizek had "artistic qualities such as clarity of verbal expression and innate sense of rhythm".

He becomes the star of the casbah in 1929 and participates in festivals in Dellys, Cherchell and the M'zab. His fame arrives in France where he recorded several 78s.

In 1937 he makes his hajj. He also becomes vice president of MC Alger.

He dies on February 12, 1955. M'rizek is buried at El Kettar cemetery.

Songs
El Mouloudia
Ya Taha El Amine
Ya Rebbi Sahelli Zora
El Qahoua ouel Atay
Mesbah Ezzine
Yal qadi
El bla fi el-kholta
Youm el djemaâ kherdjou leryam
Lellah ya ahli aâdrouni
Goulou leyamna
âla rassoul el hadi
kifèche hilti ya nassi

Bibliography

References

External links

Potential source for the article

1912 births
1955 deaths
Algerian songwriters
Algerian composers
People from Casbah